The women's lightweight double sculls competition at the 2006 Asian Games in Doha was held from 3 December to 6 December at the West Bay Lagoon.

Since Doha was scarce of water the distance had to be shortened from standard 2000 meters to 1000 meters.

Schedule 
All times are Arabia Standard Time (UTC+03:00)

Results

Heats 
 Qualification: 1 → Final A (FA), 2–3 → Repechage (R)

Heat 1

Heat 2

Repechage 
 Qualification: 1–2 → Final A (FA), 3–4 → Final B (FB)

Finals

Final B

Final A

References 

Results

External links 
Official Website

Rowing at the 2006 Asian Games